XEBJB-AM is a radio station on 570 AM in Monterrey, Nuevo León. It is owned by Grupo Radio Alegría and is known as La Voz 570, carrying a Christian format.

History
XEBJB received its concession on January 3, 1948. In the 1960s, it spawned a sister FM, XEBJB-FM 96.5 (now XHRK-FM 95.7). In 2018, XEBJB—then a Regional Mexican station known as "BJB Regional Mexicana" began being simulcast on XHGBO-FM 92.1, a GRA-owned station in General Bravo that raised its power substantially and became a rimshot of Monterrey; this ended on January 4, 2021.

References

Mass media in Monterrey